Eupithecia asteria is a moth in the  family Geometridae. It is found in Ecuador.

References

Moths described in 1987
asteria
Moths of South America